Events during the year 2016 in Bhutan.

Incumbents
 King: Jigme Khesar Namgyel Wangchuck
 Prime Minister: Tshering Tobgay

Events
2016 Bhutan National League

References

 
Bhutan
Bhutan
2010s in Bhutan
Years of the 21st century in Bhutan